A Shadow You Soon Will Be is a 1994 Argentine drama film directed by Héctor Olivera. The film was entered into the main competition at the 51st edition of the Venice Film Festival. It was also selected as the Argentine entry for the Best Foreign Language Film at the 67th Academy Awards, but was not accepted as a nominee.

Cast
 Miguel Ángel Solá as Ingeniero (as Miguel Angel Sola)
 José Soriano as Coluccini (as Pepe Soriano)
 Martín Coria as Encargado surtidor
 Roberto Carnaghi as Cura Salinas
 Hernán Jiménez as Rubio (as Hernan Gimenez)
 Pedro Segni as Petiso
 Mario Lozano as Patrón Bar
 Alfonso De Grazia as Maldonado

See also
 List of submissions to the 67th Academy Awards for Best Foreign Language Film
 List of Argentine submissions for the Academy Award for Best Foreign Language Film

References

External links
 

1994 films
1994 drama films
Argentine drama films
1990s Spanish-language films
Films directed by Héctor Olivera
1990s Argentine films